A by-election was held in the Bermondsey constituency in South London, on 24 February 1983, following the resignation of Labour MP Bob Mellish. Peter Tatchell stood as the candidate for the Labour Party, and Simon Hughes stood for the Liberal Party. Following a bitter campaign, the Liberals made huge gains and took the seat, with a majority of votes cast. Labour's vote fell from 63.6 per cent in May 1979 to 26.1 per cent as Tatchell came a distant second, while the Conservative candidate, Robert Hughes, managed only fourth place. With a swing of 44.2%, the 1983 Bermondsey by-election remains the largest by-election swing in British political history.

Preliminaries
Bob Mellish had represented the constituency and its predecessors in the House of Commons since 1946. He was the Labour Chief Whip from 1969 until 1976, but had become disenchanted with the left-wing drift of the Labour Party. He resigned from the party in August and his Parliamentary seat in November 1982, amid much acrimony within the party. He had been in dispute with his constituency party for several years and had earlier threatened to resign if Peter Tatchell was selected as the next prospective parliamentary candidate. He was recruited by the Conservative government to the board of the London Docklands Development Corporation; as he did not wish to be disqualified, the post was made non-salaried until such time as Mellish chose to accept payment. This meant that Mellish had a paid job to go to as soon as he wanted.

On 7 November 1981, Bermondsey Labour Party selected Peter Tatchell, its secretary, as prospective Parliamentary candidate. Tatchell was a leading member of the left-wing faction that had taken control of the local party the previous year. He was also a contributor to London Labour Briefing, a magazine that circulated among the London left, and had written an article suggesting the use of extra-Parliamentary direct action by the Labour Party, saying: "We must look to new, more militant forms of extra-parliamentary opposition which involve mass popular participation and challenge the government's right to rule". This call to civil disobedience was considered a call to violent action by some, and was used "as a stick to beat [Tatchell] with" by political opponents. For example, the article came to the attention of James Wellbeloved, a former London Labour MP who had defected to the Social Democratic Party; Wellbeloved then referred to it in a Parliamentary Question to Margaret Thatcher on 3 December.

Labour Party leader Michael Foot responded to Wellbeloved by denouncing Tatchell's article and declared "the individual concerned is not an endorsed member of the Labour Party and as far as I'm concerned never will be". Tony Benn wrote in his diary that many people, including himself, thought that Foot had confused Peter Tatchell with Peter Taaffe, then the leader of the Trotskyist Militant tendency, and Michael Crick in his book on Militant agrees that the fact that Tatchell and Taaffe have similar names contributed to public confusion between the two, despite the fact that Militant opposed Tatchell's candidacy due to anti-gay feeling and political differences between the old left (Militant) and new left (Tatchell) of the party. As to whether Tatchell was a member of the Labour Party itself, Foot later clarified that he meant to say "endorsed candidate" instead of "endorsed member" in his response to Wellbeloved. At the next meeting of the Labour Party National Executive Committee, Tatchell was narrowly rejected as a candidate. Mellish was not reassured about the future direction of the Labour Party and resigned from it on 2 August 1982, a clear preliminary to resigning his seat, which he did by taking the Chiltern Hundreds on 1 November that year. The left wing of the Labour Party agreed Tatchell would be eligible for selection, and Tatchell was duly selected again in January 1983.

Tabloid newspapers had begun researching his background when Foot denounced him, in particular Tatchell's activities with the Gay Liberation Front in the early 1970s. Several stories were published which made it clear that he was gay.

Other candidates

At the 1981 Greater London Council election, the Liberal Party had come second in Bermondsey. They chose their GLC candidate Simon Hughes, a barrister who had moved to the constituency earlier that year, to fight the by-election. The Conservatives chose Robert Hughes (no relation), who was a Greater London Council (GLC) Councillor in Croydon. He later became the MP for Harrow West. Among those who applied for the Conservative nomination but were not chosen was Sara Keays, then having an as yet unrevealed affair with Cecil Parkinson.

The right-wing former Labour leader of Southwark Borough Council, John O'Grady, who had been a target for the left-wing faction locally, also decided to stand under the banner 'Real Bermondsey Labour' with Bob Mellish's support and encouragement. His campaign was dominated by personal opposition to Tatchell and defence of his leadership of the council. Twelve other candidates stood, including Screaming Lord Sutch, appearing for the first time under the Official Monster Raving Loony Party label, and the Dowager Lady Birdwood.

Esmond Bevan intended to stand as an independent Labour candidate, but erroneously entered his occupation in the section on the nomination papers headed 'description', thus appearing on ballot papers as "Systems Designer".

Start of the campaign
The Labour campaign started disastrously when it was discovered that the first leaflets had been printed at Cambridge Heath Press, owned by the Militant tendency (then practising entryism in the Labour Party; a group whose five key members were expelled two days before polling day). The leaflets were all pulped and reprinted, but the cost of the first printing  still counted against the limit for election spending.

Attacks on Tatchell
There was much controversy over Tatchell's homosexuality. The Labour Party persuaded Tatchell to keep quiet about his sexual orientation, although he had previously declared himself 'out'. Various campaigners for opposition candidates, as well as many within the Labour Party, made homophobic comments about Tatchell. Widespread graffiti throughout the constituency referred to him in derogatory terms, while some of those putting up posters in his support found their windows attacked. Tatchell received hate mail, including a live cartridge, and was attacked when out in the street.

Some of the other by-election candidates joined in: John O'Grady (Southwark Council leader, who was promoted as the 'Real Bermondsey' Labour candidacy by the previous MP, Bob Mellish) was filmed touring the constituency on the back of a horse and cart, singing a song which referred to Tatchell "wearing his trousers back to front". On the last weekend of the campaign, an anonymous leaflet was sent round the constituency headed "Which Queen will you vote for?", contrasting the republican Tatchell, who was pictured looking very effeminate, with Queen Elizabeth II. The leaflet gave Tatchell's home address and telephone number.

An alternative analysis of Tatchell's eventual defeat was given by David Sutch, the Official Monster Raving Loony Party candidate, in his 1991 autobiography. When being interviewed on TV at the by-election count, Sutch related to Tatchell how horrified he was at the treatment Tatchell had received, but added that "what I did not tell him was that he had been so bad a candidate that he had largely brought it on himself". Sutch criticised Tatchell's preference for press conferences and press releases rather than traditional meeting-and-greeting, which was generally regarded as the best way to win hearts and minds at a by-election. In a later interview, when the subject of Bermondsey came up, Sutch said that Tatchell "seemed to think all he needed to do to become the MP was turn up at the count".

Homophobia, the Liberal campaign and Labour "sabotage"
During the by-election, members of the Liberal Party were accused of having joined in homophobic attacks on Tatchell. Male Liberal canvassers were seen wearing badges reading "I've been kissed by Peter Tatchell".

While this was criticised by Roy Hattersley at a news conference, elements of the Labour party were also hostile to Tatchell on the grounds both of his politics and his sexuality. He would later recall: "Subjected to 15 months of media smears, anti-gay violence and sabotage by the right of the party, I lost what had been a safe Labour seat."

In an interview with Simon Edge of The Independent published on 17 December 1996, the former Liberal Party Chief Executive, Andy Ellis, was asked whether he approved of the activity undertaken by the Liberal Gay Action Group, and replied "Nothing went on in Bermondsey that we were unhappy with".

During his campaign for leadership of the Liberal Democrats in January 2006, Hughes said he "had both homosexual and heterosexual relationships in the past" and apologised for the actions of Liberals in the Bermondsey campaign, saying that while a lot of the blame for homophobic abuse laid on the press, "I take responsibility" for the actions of his organisers, adding: "I have never been comfortable about the whole of that campaign, as Peter knows, and I said that to him in the past. ... Where there were things that were inappropriate or wrong, I apologise for that." Tatchell, by then a member of the Green Party, said that he had forgiven Hughes, saying "Simon benefited from these dirty tricks, but that was 23 years ago—I don't hold a grudge. It's time to forgive and move on", adding that Hughes should be judged on his 23-year record as an MP.

Opinion polls
Bermondsey was one of the first by-elections to be extensively polled. The polls showed, at first, that the Labour vote was substantially down on the 1979 election figures, but that none of the rival candidates were particularly close. As the campaign went on, the Liberal candidate began to move into a clear second position and the other candidates faded. Later in the campaign, there were rumours which claimed that the right-wing of the Labour Party nationally wished to lose the seat, as it would prove that left-wing Labour candidates were unelectable. By the eve of poll, it was clear that large numbers of previously Labour voters were defecting to other parties, and that non-Labour voters were lining up in support of the Liberal candidate as the one most likely to beat Labour.

Results
The Liberals made huge gains and took the seat, with a majority of votes cast. Labour's vote fell from 63.6 per cent in May 1979 to 26.1 per cent as Tatchell came a distant second, while O'Grady took third. The Conservatives managed only fourth place, for the first time since the 1974 Newham South by-election, and the last in Britain until the 1991 Liverpool Walton by-election. All candidates other than Liberal and Labour lost their deposits.

Hughes would go on to remain as Bermondsey MP for the next 32 years, making him one of very few examples of MPs who took a formerly safe seat from another party and managed to hold it for a long period of time.

The results for the previous election were:

See also
Bermondsey (UK Parliament constituency)
Miranda Grell

References

External links
British Parliamentary By Elections: Campaign literature from the by-election

Bermondsey,1983
Bermondsey,1983
Bermondsey by-election
Bermondsey by-election
Bermondsey
1983 in LGBT history
LGBT politics in the United Kingdom
Bermondsey by-election